The Ramailes Yeshiva was an Orthodox Jewish yeshiva in Šnipiškės, Vilnius, Lithuania. It was established in the early nineteenth century, most likely in 1815.

Name 

The yeshiva's commonly used name, Ramailes, is based on the name of the Jew who donated its building. His name was either Reb Mailes or Reb Maille, and slurred together, the yeshiva's name sounded like "Ramailes Yeshiva." The official name may have been Yeshiva Tomchai Torah.

History 

Sources differ regarding the year the yeshiva was founded as well as when the first yeshiva building was donated. According to one source, the yeshiva was founded in 1815. Another source states that Reb Mailes had willed a building and courtyard that he owned to be a yeshiva around that time. These sources are not contradictory, however, another sources says the yeshiva was founded in 1827, and that Reb Mailes donated a building that he owned in 1931. A fourth source, like the first, says that the yeshiva was established in 1815, and like the third, says that it only moved to Reb Mailis' building in 1931.

Regardless of the when the Rameiles Yeshiva was established, it became a well known yeshiva for European yeshiva students. The yeshiva's first rosh yeshiva was Rabbi Yoel Naftali Hertz. He was later joined by Rabbi Eliezer Teitz, a student of Rabbi Akiva Eiger. In 1840, Rabbi Yisrael Salanter was appointed rosh yeshiva, and became known for masterful lectures. However, Rabbi Salanter realized that his success in yeshiva was creating envy among other faculty members, and therefore left the yeshiva and began teaching in another beis midrash.<ref>{{cite journal |last1=Geldwerth |first1=Lipa |title=He Looked Into the Torah and Fashioned Man An Examination of the Life and Accomplishments of Reh Yisroel Salanter-A Century After His Passing |journal=The Jewish Observer |date=March 1984 |volume=XVII |issue=6 |page=11 |url=https://agudah.org/wp-content/uploads/1984/11/JO1984-V17-N06.pdf |publisher=Agudath Israel of America |quote=Yet when invited to give shiurim in Rameillas Yeshiva in Vilna in 1840, he accepted, replacing Rabbi Eliezer Teitz, famed disciple of Rabbi Akiva Eiger....Reb Yisroel took the people of Vilna by storm-especially through his brilliant lectures.... But Reb Yisroel feared that his success was creating envy among fellow faculty members; so he left Rameillas Yeshiva to lecture in another beis midrash.}}</ref>  Other rosh yeshivas between Ramailes' founding and World War I included Rabbi Mordechai Meltzer (Klecki), Rabbi Dovid Klecki, Rabbi Alexander Sender Epstein, Rabbi Yitzchak Epstein, Rabbi Meir Michel Rabinowitz (author of Meor Olam), Rabbi Yaakov Peskin, Rabbi Shmuel Peskin, and Rabbi Shmuel Isser HaKohen. After World War I, Rabbi Moshe Menachem Kozlowski became rosh yeshiva.

Later, Rabbi Meir Bassin, a member of the Vilna Rabbinate and the rav of the Vilna neighborhood of Shnipishok where the yeshiva was, became rosh yeshiva. Rabbi Chaim Ozer Grodzensky, the Rav of Vilna, oversaw the yeshiva, and in 1927, appointed Rabbi Shlomo Heiman to be rosh yeshiva; he taught the shiur'' (class) just below Rabbi Bassin's. About a year later, Rabbi Bassin died, and his son-in-law, Rabbi Yisroel Zev Gustman, began teaching in the yeshiva as well. In 1935, Rabbi Heiman left to America where he became rosh yeshiva in Yeshiva Torah Vodaath. In 1935 Rav Yisroel Levovitz HYD, son of Rav Yeruchem Levovitz zt"l, was appointed rosh yeshiva.

Merging with Yeshivas HaK'tzavim 

Yeshivas HaK'tzavim, another yeshiva in Vilna, was led by Rabbi Eliyahu Gershon Halperin. At some point before World War II, it merged with the Ramailes Yeshiva, with Rabbi Halperin joining the Ramailes faculty.

Reestablishment After World War II 

After World War II, after a few years as rosh yeshiva of Yeshiva Tomchei Temimim at 770, Rabbi Gustman opened Yeshiva Netzach Yisrael–Ramailes of Vilna, which he was very dedicated to, refusing offers to become rosh yeshiva of the Ponevezh Yeshiva and Yeshiva Torah Vodaath. In 1970, Rabbi Gustman moved to Israel and reestablished his yeshiva there, under the same name. After Rabbi Gustman's passing in 1991, his son-in-law, Rabbi Michel Bernicker became rosh yeshiva.

Notable alumni 

 Rabbi Shmuel Brudny
 Rabbi Michel Yehudah Lefkowitz
Rabbi Nochum Partzovitz

References 

Yeshivas of Lithuania
Jewish Lithuanian history
Educational institutions established in 1815
19th-century Judaism
Jews and Judaism in Vilnius
Judaism in Vilnius
Pre-World War II European yeshivas
Orthodox yeshivas in Europe
1815 establishments in the Russian Empire
Orthodox Judaism in Lithuania